In mathematics,  is the infinite series whose terms are the successive powers of two with alternating signs. As a geometric series, it is characterized by its first term, 1, and its common ratio, −2.

As a series of real numbers it diverges, so in the usual sense it has no sum. In a much broader sense,  the series is associated with another value besides ∞, namely , which is the limit of the series using the 2-adic metric.

Historical arguments
Gottfried Leibniz considered the divergent alternating series  as early as 1673. He argued that by subtracting either on the left or on the right, one could produce either positive or negative infinity, and therefore both answers are wrong and the whole should be finite:
Now normally nature chooses the middle if neither of the two is permitted, or rather if it cannot be determined which of the two is permitted, and the whole is equal to a finite quantity

Leibniz did not quite assert that the series had a sum, but he did infer an association with  following Mercator's method. The attitude that a series could equal some finite quantity without actually adding up to it as a sum would be commonplace in the 18th century, although no distinction is made in modern mathematics.

Leibniz's intuition prevented him from straining his solution this far, and he wrote back that Wolff's idea was interesting but invalid for several reasons. The arithmetic means of neighboring partial sums do not converge to any particular value, and for all finite cases one has , not . Generally, the terms of a summable series should decrease to zero; even  could be expressed as a limit of such series. Leibniz counsels Wolff to reconsider so that he "might produce something worthy of science and himself."

Modern methods

Geometric series
Any summation method possessing the properties of regularity, linearity, and stability will sum a geometric series
 

Euler summation

The Euler transform begins with the sequence of positive terms:
a0 = 1,
a1 = 2,
a2 = 4,
a3 = 8,...

The sequence of forward differences is then
Δa0 = a1 − a0 = 2 − 1 = 1,
Δa1 = a2 − a1 = 4 − 2 = 2,
Δa2 = a3 − a2 = 8 − 4 = 4,
Δa3 = a4 − a3 = 16 − 8 = 8,...

which is just the same sequence. The Euler transform is the series

Borel summation

-adic numbers

and when expressed in base 2 using two's complement, 

Thus .

See also
1 + 2 + 4 + 8 + ⋯

Notes

References

Divergent series
Geometric series
P-adic numbers